Michael Speechley (born 29 April 1964) is an Australian former professional rugby league footballer who played for Newtown, South Sydney, Cronulla-Sutherland and the Parramatta Eels. His career spanned thirteen seasons in first-grade Australian competition. He primarily played at five-eighth.

Playing career
Speechley began his first grade career with Newtown in 1983, making his first grade debut in Round 2 1983 against North Sydney.

Speechley played in Newtown's final ever game in the top grade which was against the Canberra Raiders in Round 26 1983 which Newtown won 9–6 at Campbelltown Stadium with Speechley scoring a try.

After Newtown were removed from the competition, Speechley spent 2 seasons with South Sydney before signing with Cronulla in 1986.  In 1988, Speechley was part of the Cronulla side which won the minor premiership but fell short of a grand final appearance losing to Balmain in the preliminary final.

Speechley left Cronulla at the end of the 1992 season and signed with Parramatta.  Speechley spent 3 seasons at Parramatta as the club hovered around the foot of the table.  In Speechley's last year at Parramatta, the club only won 3 games for the entire 1995 season.

Speechley was nicknamed The Lawnmower by a commentator in reference to his tackling technique.

In 2015, an article by The Daily Telegraph revealed that Speechley was the last active former player of the Newtown club at the time of his retirement.

References

1964 births
Living people
Australian rugby league players
Cronulla-Sutherland Sharks players
Newtown Jets players
Parramatta Eels players
South Sydney Rabbitohs players
Rugby league five-eighths